Andrea Stolletz (born 30 October 1963) is a German handball goalkeeper. She participated at the 1992 Summer Olympics, where the German national team placed fourth.

References 
 Profile at sports-reference.com

1963 births
Living people
People from Plauen
People from Bezirk Karl-Marx-Stadt
German female handball players
Sportspeople from Saxony
Olympic handball players of Germany
Handball players at the 1992 Summer Olympics
Recipients of the Patriotic Order of Merit in silver
20th-century German women